is a long-running Japanese cooking manga series written by  and drawn by . The manga's title is a portmanteau of the Japanese word for delicious, oishii, and the word for someone who loves to eat, kuishinbo. The series depicts the adventures of culinary journalist Shirō Yamaoka and his partner (and later wife), Yūko Kurita. It was published by Shogakukan between 1983 and 2008 in Big Comic Spirits, and resumed again on February 23, 2009, only to be put on an indefinite hiatus after the May 12, 2014, edition in the weekly Big Comic Spirits as a response by the publisher to harsh criticism of Oishinbo's treatment of the Fukushima Daiichi disaster.

Before this suspension, Oishinbo was collected in 111 tankōbon volumes, making it the 10th longest manga released and the 11th best-selling manga series in history. The series was a perennial best-seller, selling 1.2 million copies per volume, for a total of more than 135 million copies sold.

The series received the 1986 Shogakukan Manga Award for seinen/general manga. It was adapted as a 136-episode anime television series broadcast on TV Asahi from October 17, 1988, to March 17, 1992, followed by two sequel TV anime film specials in 1992 and 1993.

It was adapted into a live-action film directed by Azuma Morisaki starring Kōichi Satō and Rentarō Mikuni, and premiered on April 13, 1996. The manga is licensed in English in North America by Viz Media.

In March 2016, writer Tetsu Kariya announced on his blog that he wanted to end the manga after it returned from hiatus. He wrote that "30 years is too long for many things" and that he believed "it's about time to end it."

Plot
Oishinbo is a drama featuring journalist Shirō Yamaoka who works for Tōzai Shimbun. He is a cynical food critic who is tasked by the newspaper's owner, along with the young Yūko Kurita, to provide recipes for the "ultimate menu". During their search, they encounter Yamaoka's fastidious and demanding father, Yūzan Kaibara, a famous gourmand who tries to sabotage Yamaoka's project.

Characters
The character names listed here are in western order of family name last. The official English language manga volumes use the Japanese naming order of family name first.

  
 Played by Toshiaki Karasawa (1994 show), Masahiro Matsuoka (2007 show)
 Shirō Yamaoka a 27-year-old journalist for the 's culture division and the head of its Ultimate Menu project. He is the only son of the world-famous potter and gourmand Yūzan Kaibara. He was forced to cook in his father's Gourmet Club when he was still at school and he resents his father, blaming him for his mother's early death. He once destroyed his father's paintings and ceramics because he believed his father cared more about food and his reputation than his family. Yamaoka appears lazy and uninterested unless it concerns food where he possesses a deep knowledge. 
  
 Played by Yuriko Ishida (1-3), Yasuko Tomita (4-5) (1995 show), Yuka (2007 show)
 Kurita is Yamaoka's co-worker and assists him in the Ultimate Menu project. She is often seen with Noriko Hanamura and Kinue Tabata, and together they are referred to as the "Culture Department Flower Trio".
  
 Played by Yoshio Harada (1), Tōru Emori (2-5) (1994 show); Ken Matsudaira (2007 show)
 Kaibara is Yamaoka's father and rival. Kaibara trained Yamaoka, but the two had a falling-out. Kaibara is the founder and director of the Gourmet Club. He is also an artist and the author of the Dictionary of Poetic References. He is modelled after Kitaoji Rosanjin.
  
 Ōhara is the publisher of the Tōzai News and initiates the Supreme Menu project.
  
 Editor-in-chief of the Tōzai News.
  
 Tanimura is the director of the arts and culture department of the Tōzai News.
  
 Tomii is the deputy director of the arts and culture department
  
 Tōyama is a famous ceramicist and gourmet and is married to the much younger woman, Ryoko.
  
 Okaboshi is a talented young chef and the owner of Yamaoka's preferred place to socialize.
 
 Fuyumi becomes Okaboshi's wife and runs the restaurant with him.
  
 Seiichi's younger brother who works as a chef in Kaibara's Gourmet Club.
  
 A wealthy businessman and a gourmet who lives in Osaka.
  
 She is a friend of Yūko Kurita and one of the "Culture Department Flower Trio".
  
 She is a friend of Yūko Kurita and one of the "Culture Department Flower Trio".
  
 A Police Inspector with a gruff exterior, but he is quite soft-hearted and forms a friendship with Yamaoka.
  
 A homeless man who collects leftovers from various restaurants in Ginza, so he knows which ones have the highest quality food. He introduced Yamaoka to Okaboshi's restaurant.
  
 He is the head chef of the Gourmet Club.
  
 An American food writer and researcher who gets acquainted with Yamaoka and Kurita when he is in Japan studying tofu dishes. He later becomes a rakugo artist and takes the name Kairakutei. His original name is Henry James Black but he also uses the pen name Stan Black.
  
 One half of a manzai comedy duo. She marries Kairakutei Black and they have a daughter together.
  
 Mariko Niki is a co-worker of Yamaoka and Kurita who writes for Touzai Graph a weekly pictorial magazine. Her family is very wealthy. Her father is Takashi Niki, the president of one of Japan's biggest banks. She studied at a university in Paris and transferred back to Japan from the Touzai Paris office. To the dismay of Yūko Kurita, she pursues Yamaoka romantically but he is not interested in marrying her. Later, she marries a freelance photographer named .
  
 Teruko is Mariko's aunt. Mariko believes her difficult personality is the reason she's still unmarried. However, eventually she marries a novelist called Katamori.
  
 Mariko's grandfather and chairman of the Nito Financial Group. He believes he should have a say in who Mariko chooses as a husband.
  
A friend of Kairakutei Black and an editor for an American magazine. He often asks Yamaoka and his colleagues for help when he writes articles about Japan. His Japanese is strange as he uses archaic words and odd expressions.

Media

Manga
Volume List

Anime

The manga was adapted into a television anime series that ran from October 1988 to March 1992 for 136 episodes.

Video games
Oishinbo: Kyukyoku no Menu 3bon Syoubu (Family Computer, 1989, developed by TOSE)
Oishinbo: DS Recipe Shuu (Nintendo DS, 2007, published by Namco Bandai Games)

North American release
The manga is licensed in English in North America by Viz Media, which published the first volume in January 2009. Seven volumes from the  series were published from January 2009 to January 2010. These editions are thematic compilations (and include stories from across the timeline), making the English editions effectively a best of the "best of." These volumes are:

Oishinbo: Japanese Cuisine, Vol. 1 (January 20, 2009; à la Carte volume 20) 
Oishinbo: Sake, Vol. 2 (March 17, 2009; à la Carte volume 26) 
Oishinbo: Ramen & Gyoza, Vol. 3 (May 19, 2009; à la Carte volume 2) 
Oishinbo: Fish, Sushi & Sashimi, Vol. 4 (July 21, 2009; à la Carte volume 5) 
Oishinbo: Vegetables, Vol. 5 (September 15, 2009; à la Carte volume 19) 
Oishinbo: The Joy of Rice, Vol. 6 (November 17, 2009; à la Carte volume 13) 
Oishinbo: Izakaya: Pub Food, Vol. 7 (January 19, 2010; à la Carte volume 12)

Reception
In the 1980s Japan had an upsurge in popularity in the gurume movement, called the "gourmet boom." Iorie Brau, author of "Oishinbo’s Adventures in Eating: Food, Communication, and Culture in Japanese Comics," said that this was the largest factor of the increase in popularity of gurume comics. The series's first volume sold around one million copies. The popularity of Oishinbo the comic lead to the development of the anime, the live action film, and many fansites. The fan-sites chronicle recipes that appeared in the manga.

Tetsu Kariya, the writer of Oishinbo, has said in a 1986 interview that he was not a food connoisseur, and that he felt embarrassed whenever food experts read the comic.

Controversy regarding Fukushima episodes
Responding to severe criticism of Oishinbo's treatment of the Fukushima nuclear disaster, Shogakukan Inc. halted publication of Oishinbo, at least temporarily, its last appearance thus being the May 12, 2014, edition in the weekly Big Comic Spirits. Although the halt of publication coincides with the controversy, the editorial staff also claim that it is part of a previously scheduled break. Before its termination, the final chapters of Oishinbo were given credit with bringing to the forefront a franker discussion of radiation effects flowing from the disaster.

Notes

References

External links
 Oishinbo, a la carte (Spanish)

 

1983 manga
1988 anime television series debuts
1992 anime films
1992 Japanese television series endings
1993 anime films
1993 films
Anime series based on manga
Anime television films
Comedy anime and manga
Cooking in anime and manga
Seinen manga
Shin-Ei Animation
Shogakukan manga
Television series about journalism
TV Asahi original programming
Viz Media manga
Winners of the Shogakukan Manga Award for general manga